Iwanicki (feminine Iwanicka) is a Polish surname, it originated as a toponymic surname for someone from Iwaniec (now Iwonicz) in Krosno Voivodeship, or Iwanki, Iwanovice, or other places. Notable people include:

 Krzysztof Iwanicki, Polish footballer
 Leszek Iwanicki, Polish footballer
 Piotr Iwanicki, Polish dancer
 Sebastian Iwanicki, Polish footballer
 Stanisław Iwanicki, Polish politician

Notes and references

Polish-language surnames